NBC 16 may refer to one of the following television stations in the United States:

Current
KMTR, Eugene, Oregon
KSNF, Joplin, Missouri
WNDU-TV, South Bend, Indiana
WPBI-LD2, Lafayette, Indiana
WWPI-LD, Fort Kent / Presque Isle, Maine

Former
KEDD-TV, Wichita, Kansas
KTGF (now KJJC-TV), Great Falls, Montana
K16BY (now KIVY-LD), Crockett, Texas
Was a translator for KETK-TV in Jacksonville / Tyler, Texas